Super PI is a computer program that calculates pi to a specified number of digits after the decimal point—up to a maximum of 32 million. It uses Gauss–Legendre algorithm and is a Windows port of the program used by Yasumasa Kanada in 1995 to compute pi to 232 digits.

Significance
Super PI is popular in the overclocking community, both as a benchmark to test the performance of these systems  and as a stress test to check that they are still functioning correctly.

Credibility concerns
The competitive nature of achieving the best Super PI calculation times led to fraudulent Super PI results, reporting calculation times faster than normal. Attempts to counter the fraudulent results resulted in a modified version of Super PI, with a checksum to validate the results. However, other methods exist of producing inaccurate or fake time results, raising questions about the program's future as an overclocking benchmark.

Super PI utilizes x87 floating point instructions which are supported on all x86 and x86-64 processors, current versions which also support the lower precision Streaming SIMD Extensions vector instructions.

The future
Super PI is single threaded, so its relevance as a measure of performance in the current era of multi-core processors is diminishing quickly. Therefore, wPrime has been developed to support multiple threaded calculations to be run at the same time so one can test stability on multi-core machines. Other multithreaded programs include: Hyper PI, IntelBurnTest, Prime95, Montecarlo superPI, OCCT or y-cruncher. Last but not least, while SuperPi is unable to calculate more than 32 million digits, and Alexander J. Yee & Shigeru Kondo were able to set a record of 10 Trillion 50 Digits of Pi using y-cruncher under a 2 x Intel Xeon X5680 @ 3.33 GHz - (12 physical cores, 24 hyperthreaded) computer on October 16, 2011 Super PI is much slower than these other programs, and utilizes inferior algorithms to them.

References

External links
 
 

Benchmarks (computing)
Pi-related software